Northbrook Court is a shopping mall in Northbrook, Illinois with a collection of stores serving the North Shore suburbs of Chicago.

This mall also features a 14-screen Dine-In AMC Theatres on the south side of the mall. It is managed and co-owned by Brookfield Properties.

History
Northbrook Court originally opened in 1976 with Lord & Taylor, Neiman Marcus, and Sears. I. Magnin opened later on.

Sears closed in 1983 due to the company determining that the store's market too closely overlapped that of the nearby stores at Hawthorn Mall and Golf Mill Mall. It was converted into a prototype for JCPenney that same year, and then torn down in 1995 for a new Marshall Field's (later Macy's). General Cinema opened on November 22, 1996, with 14 auditoriums. It was converted into an AMC Theatres in 2002. A free standing Crate & Barrel home store on the northwest corner of the mall opened that same year. Crate & Barrel used to be where Arhaus is.

California Pizza Kitchen opened its doors on Northbrook Court's north side for the first time in August 2010. On May 16, 2014, Arhaus officially opened at the mall's east.

The late 2010s and early 2020s saw multiple classic chain anchors retreat from brick and mortar after being disrupted by digital retailers in recent years including many brand-name retailers like Michael Kors, Kate Spade NY, Lucky Brand Jeans and many more especially during the pandemic, H&M, Abercrombie, Banana Republic, Build-A-Bear, Burberry, Victoria’s Secret and more pulled out.

On May 11, 2019, it was announced, Macy's,  which maintains additional outposts close by, would shutter as part of a strategy to maximize profits. The store was razed for a new mixed-use development which is currently being revised by the mall owners.

On August 27, 2020, it was announced that the Lord & Taylor location at the mall would be closing.

On June 30, 2021, Shoppers Find, a new kind of discount Department store, opened in the former Lord & Taylor space.

January 2021 was a hard time for the mall, many retailers left most notably being Abercrombie & Fitch.

That next January 2022, was even worse, losing AVEDA, J. Jill, J. Crew, a 20,392 square feet H&M and more.

In 2007, Northbrook Court took down their traditional food court for a unique prototype, which has now failed. They gave most the space to Forever 21, then there was 4 spots of dine-in food court stores, originally housing Chinese Gourmet Express, Tony & Bruno’s, Subway and Corner Bakery Cafe. A few stores came and went over the years and the only store left is Tony & Bruno’s. The mall features 6 sit-down spaces but 4 are occupied currently. NM Cafe (inside Neiman Marcus), California Pizza Kitchen, Di Pescara and a outparcel P.F. Chang’s. The Claim Company and Stir Crazy closed and/or moved.

On September 1, 2022, Shopper’s Find announced they were closing their store and immediately began liquidating that day. The store closed on November 28, 2022, this means Northbrook Court would again have 2 anchors left.

Location

Northbrook Court is located on Lake Cook Road (Cook County Trunk Highway A50), between the Tri-State Tollway (Interstate 94/294) and Edens Expressway (Interstate 94/U.S. Highway 41). It is approximately 25 miles from downtown Chicago and approximately four to 12 miles from the nine communities that make up the North Shore and is accessible via public transit from them and the City of Chicago. It is only eight miles from Westfield Old Orchard. Although smaller than Old Orchard, it competes with Old Orchard as well as several other suburban shopping centers in the Chicago area.

Filming

John Hughes, who grew up in Northbrook, and attended Glenbrook North High School, used the mall for his teenage film Weird Science, a movie about two outcasts who create a girl, who in turn helps them stand up for themselves. The side of the mall used in the film for exterior shots is currently a California Pizza Kitchen and the former The Claim Company. The inside of the mall was also used, however it has changed since the filming.

A scene from Ordinary People was filmed at the mall. Mary Tyler Moore’s character Beth Jarrett is shown shopping at Neiman Marcus and riding the escalator.

Bus routes  
Pace

  213 Green Bay Road 
  422 Linden CTA/Glenview/Northbrook Court  
  471 Highland Park/Northbrook Court  
  626 Skokie – Buffalo Grove Limited

References

External links

1976 establishments in Illinois
Brookfield Properties
Northbrook, Illinois
Shopping malls established in 1976
Shopping malls in Cook County, Illinois